Formimidoyltransferase cyclodeaminase or formiminotransferase cyclodeaminase (symbol FTCD in humans) is an enzyme that catalyzes the conversion of formiminoglutamate and tetrahydrofolate into formiminotetrahydrofolate and glutamate.

Role in pathology
Mutations of the FTCD gene cause glutamate formiminotransferase deficiency.

See also
 Glutamate-1-semialdehyde

References

External links